Trivia Trap is an American game show produced by Mark Goodson Productions. It was created by producer Goodson and originally ran from October 8, 1984 to April 5, 1985 on ABC. The game featured two teams of three contestants each competing against each other to answer trivia questions in various formats. Bob Eubanks was the host, and Gene Wood announced during the first two weeks. Charlie O'Donnell announced during the third week and was replaced by Bob Hilton for the remainder of the series.

Gameplay
Two teams of three contestantsthe Juniors, who wore blue sweaters and were under 30 years of age; and the Seniors, who wore red sweaters and who were over the age of 30answered trivia questions to reach a goal of $1,000. The members of the championship team then competed individually to win or share a top prize of $10,000.

First format
Two sets of four answers each were displayed. The team in control chose one set and was asked a question, and each member in turn attempted to eliminate one wrong answer. Their turn ended when either all three wrong answers or the correct answer had been chosen. The team received $50 for eliminating one wrong answer, $100 for two, or $300 for all three. A new set of answers was then displayed to replace the ones that had been used, and the other team then played.

Two rounds were played in this manner; each team had one turn per round, with the seniors always choosing first. At the end of the second round, the host asked a question concerning the last unused set of answers for viewers to play along; the correct answer was revealed at the start of the Trivia Race.

This format remained in place until December 14, 1984. Goodson reworked the format after a focus group from the American Film Institute indicated that eliminating wrong answers was a format flaw.

Second format
The reworked format began with the host asking a trivia question to the home audience, then revealing its answer after both teams had been introduced.

Fact or Fiction?
The first round consisted entirely of true/false questions.

The previous day's champions selected one of two question packets, and each team member was asked one question worth $25. After all three members had answered, the challengers played the other packet.

Two sets of questions were played, with the challengers given first choice for the second set.

The Trivia Trap Round
The team in the lead (or the champions, in case of a tie) played first and had a choice of two categories. After the category was chosen, the host asked a question and four answers were shown. One contestant answered, and each of the other two had to agree or disagree. The correct answer awarded $200 if all three agreed, $100 if one contestant disagreed, or $50 if two disagreed. If the original answer was incorrect and if any contestants had disagreed with it, they had a chance to choose the correct one in the same manner described above and win the appropriate amount. Two pairs of categories were played, one category per team in each pair.

$1,000 Trivia Race
Control of this round began with the team in the lead. If the score was tied, the champions (or the winners of a coin toss, if both teams were new) started the round. The team in control chose one of three categories, and each member had one chance to answer a question asked by the host. The correct answer awarded $100 and allowed them to keep control, but if all three members missed it, control passed to the opposing team. The chosen category was then discarded and replaced in either case. When a team either answered a question correctly or gained control due to a miss by their opponents, the member after the one who had last given an answer chose the next category and had first chance to respond.

The first team to accumulate $1,000 or more won the game and advanced to the $10,000 Trivia Ladder bonus round. Except for a brief period in February 1985, the question value doubled to $200 if neither team had reached this goal after the tenth question. Both teams kept their accumulated money and divided it evenly among all three members.

$10,000 Trivia Ladder
The three members of the winning team were assigned to positions 1, 2, and 3 in descending order of their performance in the Trivia Race. The #1 contestant was shown a set of four answers and had to decide whether to play or pass to the #2 contestant, who in turn could either play or pass; a second pass forced the #3 contestant to play by default. The host then asked a question, and the contestant in control chose one answer. A correct response awarded $1,000 to that individual contestant and allowed him/her to take part in the final $10,000 question, while a miss eliminated him/her from the round.

Three questions were played in this manner, with the second question initially offered to the higher-ranked contestant who had not answered the first one and the third question given to the last remaining contestant with no option to pass.

Any team members who answered correctly were shown a fourth set of answers and asked one more question. If two or more members took part, each one secretly chose an answer by pressing a button at his/her desk; if only one was playing, he/she would simply state an answer choice aloud. Team members who answered correctly won equal shares of the day's $10,000 grand prize. If no one answered their individual question correctly, the final question was not played.

Any team that played the Trivia Ladder five times retired undefeated.

Broadcast history
Trivia Trap premiered on October 8, 1984 in ABC's 11:00 AM timeslot, taking over the time period for a house of reruns (like Benson, celebrity Family Feud specials, etc.). That time was home to popular game shows The Price Is Right on CBS and Wheel of Fortune on NBC and struggled as a result. ABC canceled Trivia Trap after six months and 128 episodes; the show's final episode aired on April 5, 1985. The following Monday, All-Star Blitz took over the show's timeslot.  Game Show Network has aired the show several times on the network.  Buzzr aired the first two episodes as part of the "Lost and Found" marathon in September 2017, and the show continued to air on Buzzr until April 2018.

Trivia Trap was the final Mark Goodson-produced game show to have an original format. From then until the acquisition of Goodson's company by the predecessors of FremantleMedia, all of the shows produced by Mark Goodson Productions were revivals of previous series.

References

External links

American Broadcasting Company original programming
1980s American game shows
1984 American television series debuts
1985 American television series endings
Television series by Mark Goodson-Bill Todman Productions
Television series by Fremantle (company)
English-language television shows